Lighting ratio in photography refers to the comparison of key light (the main source of light from which shadows fall) to the  fill light (the light that fills in the shadow areas). The higher the lighting ratio, the higher the contrast of the image; the lower the ratio, the lower the contrast. Since the lighting ratio is the ratio of the light levels on the brightest lit to the least lit parts of the subject, and the brightest lit are lit by both key (K) and fill (F), therefore the lighting ratio is properly (K+F):F although for contrast ratios of 4:1 or more, then K:F is sufficiently accurate.

Light can be measured in footcandles. A key light of 200 footcandles and a fill light of 100 footcandles have a 3:1 ratio (a ratio of three to one) whereas a keylight of 800 footcandles and a fill light of 200 footcandles has a ratio of 4:1 according to the lighting ratio formula.

The ratio can be determined in relation to F stops since each increase in f-stop is equal to double the amount of light: 2 to the power of the difference in f stops is equal to the first factor in the ratio. For example, a difference in two f-stops between key and fill is 2 squared, or 4:1 ratio. A difference in 3 stops is 2 cubed, or an 8:1 ratio. No difference is equal to 2 to the power of 0, for a 1:1 ratio.

In situations such as motion picture lighting sometimes the lighting ratio is described as key plus fill to fill alone. A light meter can automatically calculate the ratio of key plus fill to fill alone.

See also
 High-key lighting
 Low-key lighting
 Silhouette

References

Science of photography
Engineering ratios